Sherman Alexander Williams (born September 1, 1972) is a Bahamian professional heavyweight boxer. He has fought former world champions and contenders Evander Holyfield, Ruslan Chagaev, Joseph Parker, Gerald Washington, Robert Helenius, Manuel Charr, Jameel McCline, Obed Sullivan, and Alfred Cole.

Professional career

Williams' first notable win after turning pro in 1997 came in 1999 when he won against the previously unbeaten Frank Wood in two rounds. In 2000, he fought against Jameel McCline in a match that ended in a 10-round draw. He followed this up with a six round decision against Cisse Salif. He won the WBA FEDECARIBE Heavyweight title on December 6, 2003. Two years later, Williams won the WBC CABOFE on December 5, 2005, defeating Willie Perryman in the undercard match of the Winky Wright/Sam Soliman Middleweight bout. This was followed by the NBA Heavyweight title on March 31, 2006. On July 28, Williams defeated Josh Gutcher 71 seconds into the first round. Upon his return to the Bahamas Williams made his eight consecutive victory on April 18, 2007, defeating Wade Lewis with a first round KO. On January 22, 2011 Williams fought against Evander Holyfield at The Greenbrier in White Sulphur Springs, West Virginia. Holyfield started the bout slowly and in the second round, he was cut in the left eye following an accidental clash of heads. In round three as he took several combinations. After the end of the round, Holyfield told his corner that he was unable to see due to the cut. Consequently, the bout was ruled a no contest. Williams admitted his frustrations to the press, telling them that after the fiasco he was considering taking fights in Europe. In 2012, he pulled off an upset win over Chauncy Welliver, before losing to Robert Helenius. In June 2013, he was outpointed by Gerald Washington.

Professional boxing record

|-
| align="center" style="border-style: none none solid solid; background: #e3e3e3"|Result
| align="center" style="border-style: none none solid solid; background: #e3e3e3"|Record
| align="center" style="border-style: none none solid solid; background: #e3e3e3"|Opponent
| align="center" style="border-style: none none solid solid; background: #e3e3e3"|Type
| align="center" style="border-style: none none solid solid; background: #e3e3e3"|Round
| align="center" style="border-style: none none solid solid; background: #e3e3e3"|Date
| align="center" style="border-style: none none solid solid; background: #e3e3e3"|Location
| align="center" style="border-style: none none solid solid; background: #e3e3e3"|Notes
|-align=center
|Win
|
|align=left| Epifanio Mendoza
|TKO
|3 
|26/05/2018
|align=left| A Social Affair and Convention Center, Freeport, Bahamas
|align=left|
|-align=center
|Win
|
|align=left| Mateus Roberto Osorio
|KO
|1 
|03/12/2016
|align=left| Ceres Arena, Aarhus, Germany
|align=left|
|-align=center
|Win
|
|align=left| Jamal Woods
|UD
|6
|23/04/2016
|align=left| Police Athletic League, Elizabeth City
|align=left|
|-align=center
|Loss
|
|align=left| Christian Hammer
|UD
|10
|28/08/2015
|align=left| Pationoarul Dunarea, Galați, Romania
|align=left|
|-align=center
|Win
|
|align=left| Manuel Banquez
|KO
|1 
|05/12/2014
|align=left| Kendal Isaacs Gym, New Providence, The Bahamas
|align=left|
|-align=center
|Loss
|
|align=left| Joseph Parker
|UD
|10
|16/10/2014
|align=left| The Trusts Arena, Auckland, New Zealand
|align=left|
|-align=center
|Win
|
|align=left| Earl Ladson
|UD
|4
|22/11/2013
|align=left| The Ritz, Raleigh, North Carolina, U.S.
|align=left|
|-align=center
|Loss
|
|align=left| Gerald Washington
|UD
|8
|08/06/2013
|align=left| StubHub Center, Carson, California, U.S.
|align=left|
|-align=center
|Loss
|
|align=left| Robert Helenius
|UD
|10
|10/11/2012
|align=left| Ice Hall, Helsinki, Finland
|align=left|
|-align=center
|Win
|
|align=left| Chauncy Welliver
|MD
|12
|28/06/2012
|align=left| Grand Waldo Conference & Exhibition Centre, Cotai, Macau
|align=left|
|-align=center
|style="background:#ddd;"|NC
|
|align=left| Evander Holyfield
|NC
|3 
|22/01/2011
|align=left| The Greenbrier, White Sulphur Springs, West Virginia, U.S.
|align=left|
|-align=center
|Loss
|
|align=left| Manuel Charr
|UD
|10
|10/10/2009
|align=left| Stadthalle, Rostock, Germany
|align=left|
|-align=center
|Win
|
|align=left| Andrew Greeley
|UD
|6
|12/12/2008
|align=left| Bourbon Street Station, Jacksonville, Florida, U.S.
|align=left|
|-align=center
|Win
|
|align=left| Wade Lewis
|KO
|1 
|18/04/2007
|align=left| Clifford Park, Nassau, Bahamas
|align=left|
|-align=center
|Win
|
|align=left| Ralph West
|KO
|3 
|19/01/2007
|align=left| Knox Arena, Olive Branch, Mississippi, U.S.
|align=left|
|-align=center
|Win
|
|align=left| Josh Gutcher
|TKO
|1 
|04/08/2006
|align=left| Knox Arena, Las Vegas, Nevada, U.S.
|align=left|
|-align=center
|Win
|
|align=left| Earl Ladson
|UD
|6
|05/05/2006
|align=left| Ybor City Multi Fight Complex, Tampa, Florida, U.S.
|align=left|
|-align=center
|Win
|
|align=left| David Washington
|KO
|3 
|31/03/2006
|align=left| Multi Fight Complex, Tampa, Florida, U.S.
|align=left|
|-align=center
|Win
|
|align=left| Dennis McKinney
|UD
|4
|24/02/2006
|align=left| Dover Downs, Dover, Delaware, U.S.
|align=left|
|-align=center
|Win
|
|align=left| Willie Perryman
|UD
|10
|10/12/2005
|align=left| Mohegan Sun Casino, Uncasville, Connecticut, U.S.
|align=left|
|-align=center
|Win
|
|align=left| Harold Sconiers
|UD
|6
|15/10/2005
|align=left| UCF Arena, Kissimmee, Florida, U.S.
|align=left|
|-align=center
|Loss
|
|align=left| Ruslan Chagaev
|UD
|8
|26/03/2005
|align=left| Erdgas Arena, Riesa, Germany
|align=left|
|-align=center
|Draw
|25-9-2
|align=left| Gilbert Martinez
|PTS
|10
|14/11/2004
|align=left| HP Pavilion, San Jose, California, U.S.
|align=left|
|-align=center
|Win
|25-9-1
|align=left| Leon Turner
|TKO
|5 
|12/06/2004
|align=left| Kendal G L Isaacs National Gym, Nassau, Bahamas
|align=left|
|-align=center
|Loss
|24-9-1
|align=left| Kelvin Hale
|SD
|8
|06/03/2004
|align=left| Turning Stone Casino, Verona, New York, U.S.
|align=left|
|-align=center
|Win
|24-8-1
|align=left| Miguel Otero
|TKO
|4 
|06/12/2003
|align=left| National Gymnasium, Nassau, Bahamas
|align=left|
|-align=center
|Loss
|23-8-1
|align=left| Tye Fields
|UD
|12
|02/09/2003
|align=left| Mountaineer Casino Racetrack & Resort, Chester, West Virginia, U.S.
|align=left|
|-align=center
|Win
|23-7-1
|align=left| Lenzie Morgan
|UD
|6
|03/07/2003
|align=left| Mountaineer Casino Racetrack & Resort, Chester, West Virginia, U.S.
|align=left|
|-align=center
|Win
|22-7-1
|align=left| Gabe Brown
|UD
|10
|01/03/2003
|align=left| Thomas & Mack Center, Las Vegas, Nevada, U.S.
|align=left|
|-align=center
|Win
|21-7-1
|align=left| Garing Lane
|UD
|6
|06/12/2002
|align=left| Arena Boxing Gym, St. Petersburg, Florida, U.S.
|align=left|
|-align=center
|Loss
|20-7-1
|align=left| Taurus Sykes
|UD
|10
|20/10/2002
|align=left| Emerald Queen Casino, Tacoma, Washington, U.S.
|align=left|
|-align=center
|Win
|20-6-1
|align=left| Samson Po'uha
|MD
|10
|21/04/2002
|align=left| Flamingo Hilton, Laughlin, Nevada, U.S.
|align=left|
|-align=center
|Win
|19-6-1
|align=left| Al Cole
|UD
|10
|26/01/2002
|align=left| MSG Theater, New York, New York, U.S.
|align=left|
|-align=center
|Loss
|18-6-1
|align=left| Obed Sullivan
|SD
|10
|20/05/2001
|align=left| Belterra Casino Resort, Elizabeth, Indiana, U.S.
|align=left|
|-align=center
|Win
|18-5-1
|align=left| Cisse Salif
|UD
|6
|02/11/2000
|align=left| Bethlehem, Pennsylvania, U.S.
|align=left|
|-align=center
|Draw
|17-5-1
|align=left| Jameel McCline
|PTS
|10
|29/06/2000
|align=left| Hammerstein Ballroom, New York, New York, U.S.
|align=left|
|-align=center
|Win
|17–5
|align=left|Crawford Dennary
|KO
|1 
|08/04/2000
|align=left| Nassau, Bahamas
|align=left|
|-align=center
|Win
|16–5
|align=left| Ron Guerrero
|UD
|10
|31/03/2000
|align=left| Hammerstein Ballroom, New York, New York, U.S.
|align=left|
|-align=center
|Loss
|15–5
|align=left| Derrick Banks
|PTS
|10
|18/11/1999
|align=left| Spotlight 29 Casino, Coachella, California, U.S.
|align=left|
|-align=center
|Loss
|15–4
|align=left| Tommy Martin
|UD
|10
|29/10/1999
|align=left| Molson Centre, Montreal, Quebec, Canada
|align=left|
|-align=center
|Win
|15–3
|align=left| Charles Cue
|KO
|1 
|11/09/1999
|align=left| Nassau, Bahamas
|align=left|
|-align=center
|Win
|14–3
|align=left| Frank Wood
|TKO
|2 
|05/08/1999
|align=left| Grand Casino, Tunica, Mississippi, U.S.
|align=left|
|-align=center
|Loss
|13–3
|align=left| Robert Davis
|TKO
|5 
|20/05/1999
|align=left| Grand Casino, Tunica, Mississippi, U.S.
|align=left|
|-align=center
|Win
|13–2
|align=left| Andrew Staley
|PTS
|6
|25/03/1999
|align=left| St. Petersburg Coliseum, St. Petersburg, Florida, U.S.
|align=left|
|-align=center
|Win
|12–2
|align=left| Miguel Otero
|UD
|6
|24/02/1999
|align=left| Four Ambassadors Hotel, Miami, Florida, U.S.
|align=left|
|-align=center
|Win
|11–2
|align=left| Isaac Poole
|TKO
|1 
|30/01/1999
|align=left| Flagler Dog Track, Miami, Florida, U.S.
|align=left|
|-align=center
|Win
|10–2
|align=left| Ronald Lewis
|TKO
|1 
|05/12/1998
|align=left| Mahi Temple Shrine Auditorium, Miami, Florida, U.S.
|align=left|
|-align=center
|Win
|9–2
|align=left| Willie Driver
|KO
|1 
|13/11/1998
|align=left| Egypt Shrine Temple, Tampa, Florida, U.S.
|align=left|
|-align=center
|Win
|8–2
|align=left| Floyd Womack
|TKO
|2 
|03/11/1998
|align=left| Mahi Temple Shrine Auditorium, Miami, Florida, U.S.
|align=left|
|-align=center
|Win
|7–2
|align=left| Harry Daniels
|KO
|1 
|15/09/1998
|align=left| Charlotte County Auditorium, Punta Gorda, Florida, U.S.
|align=left|
|-align=center
|Win
|6–2
|align=left| Derrick Edwards
|UD
|4
|08/08/1998
|align=left| Mahi Temple Shrine Auditorium, Miami, Florida, U.S.
|align=left|
|-align=center
|Win
|5–2
|align=left| Robert Williams
|KO
|1 
|27/06/1998
|align=left| North River Gym, Miami, Florida, U.S.
|align=left|
|-align=center
|Win
|4–2
|align=left| Sean Rickards
|TKO
|1 
|09/05/1998
|align=left| Mahi Temple Shrine Auditorium, Miami, Florida, U.S.
|align=left|
|-align=center
|Win
|3–2
|align=left| Vale Payton
|TKO
|1 
|11/04/1998
|align=left| Mahi Temple Shrine Auditorium, Miami, Florida, U.S.
|align=left|
|-align=center
|Win
|2–2
|align=left| Tracy Williams
|KO
|1 
|28/03/1998
|align=left| PAL Gymnasium, Homestead, Florida, U.S.
|align=left|
|-align=center
|Loss
|1–2
|align=left| Renard Jones
|UD
|6
|26/11/1997
|align=left| Arizona Charlie's, Las Vegas, Nevada, U.S.
|align=left|
|-align=center
|Win
|1–1
|align=left| Alex Desir
|TKO
|2 
|30/07/1997
|align=left| Arizona Charlie's, Las Vegas, Nevada, U.S.
|align=left|
|-align=center
|Loss
|0–1
|align=left| Renard Jones
|MD
|4
|24/06/1997
|align=left| Arizona Charlie's, Las Vegas, Nevada, U.S.
|align=left|
|-align=center

References

External links

Bahamian male boxers
Heavyweight boxers
1972 births
Living people
People from Freeport, Bahamas